is a Japanese manga series by Noriko Kuwata serialized in Manga Life since the November 2001 issue. It was later adapted into a comedy anime series on Kids Station, a Japanese broadcast satellite station. It features characters that wear kigurumi costumes. Each character in the anime does not live up to the standards of their species, making them outcasts who must live in the "Useless" Forest. The main character, Uruno, is a wolf who has the personality of a shy rabbit; meanwhile, his friend and foil, Usahara the rabbit, has a wolf-like dominance and aggression.
Each of the 26 episodes is 5 minutes long, bringing the total series to 130 minutes (2 hours 10 minutes).

Main characters
 Uruno (a wolf)
 Uruno is sent to live in the forest with other 'useless' animals since he fails to act lupine or possess any traits of his species. Instead of being aggressive and fierce like a wolf, he is very shy and passive, often at the receiving end of Usahara's physical outbursts. Usahara, the rabbit, can be seen as a foil to Uruno since the rabbit is more assertive and the wolf is more timid in this case. He has a crush on the cute little Chiiko-chan, hoping that even though he’s useless, he will win her heart someday. He is very easily moved to tears and can be said to be quite gullible, particularly in the face of Yunihiko's trickery.

 

 Usahara (a rabbit)
 Usahara is an aggressive, bad-tempered rabbit who chain smokes. He often gets annoyed at Uruno and physically abuses him, but it seems he does care for the wolf, as shown when Uruno disappears in episode 26. He is revealed to have bouts of melancholy, which usually resolve themselves in a matter of days. He has a competitive friendship with Yunihiko, and the two often try to one-up each other.

 

 Chiiko (a cheetah)
 Chiiko is a clumsy little cheetah girl who Uruno has a huge crush on. She is clueless, bad at running, and unskilled at hunting, but is very friendly and well-liked. She is also a member of the Female Feline Club, along with fellow wildcats Kuron, Rinku, and Piyu. She is shown to enjoy cooking, but is a miserable failure at it, as the prepared food leaves her friends quite ill. In spite of this, Uruno always eats the offered food as a show of his love.

 

 Yunihiko (a unicorn)
 Yunihiko, the Master of the Forest, is a devilish, 'unpure' unicorn who enjoys drinking sake and eating fried squid. He is Peganosuke's twin brother. Mischievous, but never malevolent, he often lies to manipulate Uruno and Usahara for his own amusement. On rare occasions he is seen to have a conscience, but this does not stop him from thoroughly enjoying getting the other animals riled up.

 

 Peganosuke (a Pegasus)
 Peganosuke is Yunihiko's twin brother, who works as a courier delivering packages. He is very shy and timid, but quickly becomes friends with Uruno, due to their shared lack of self-confidence. He takes Uruno for flights, after Uruno helps him to realize that he should enjoy life and see things never seen before.

 

 Takaoka (an eagle)
 Takaoka is a grumpy, near-sighted eagle who is at constant conflict with Usahara. He is poor at hunting, and somewhat cowardly. In the first episode he declares that he and Uruno should ally themselves together against Usahara, but this is short-lived, because neither is strong enough to fight the rabbit. Takaoka has a secret crush on Fukurou, an owl.

Secondary characters
 Kumanee (a bear)
 Kumanee is a traveling saleswoman. She is outgoing and friendly, often sharing leftover goods with her companions. She shares a deep bond with Usahara, being his good friend while also his rival in combat.

 

 Kumakawa (a bear)
 Kumakawa is Kumanee's younger brother. He's a lively dancer and refers to himself a "genius dancer."

 Kuron (a panther)
 Kuron is the most tomboyish girl in the Female Feline Club, and does not frighten easily.

 Rinku (a mountain cat)
 Rinku is the most feminine member of the Female Feline Club.

 Piyu (a puma)
 Piyu is an athletic member of the Female Feline Club, and is always seen wearing a jogging suit.

 Sakamata (an orca)
 Sakamata is calm and lonely boy, and becomes Uruno's friend quickly. He needs a life preserver to stay afloat, because he cannot swim.

 Fukurou (an owl)
 Fukurou is a straightforward girl and says exactly what she thinks. She has a crush on Peganosuke.

Music
Opening theme
"Sekai de Ichiban Boku ga Suki!" by Ryōko Shintani
Ending theme
"Life is Free" by Ryōko Shintani

External links
Kid's Station's official series site 

2001 manga
2005 anime television series debuts
Anime series
Comedy anime and manga
Fantasy anime and manga
Kemonomimi
Magic Bus (studio)
Takeshobo manga
Seinen manga
Television series about wolves
Animated television series about rabbits and hares
Animated television series about horses
Animated television series about birds